Straight to the Heart is a 1984 album by David Sanborn. The recording won the 1986 Grammy Award for Best Jazz Fusion Performance.

Reception
The AllMusic review by Scott Yanow stated: "With bassist Marcus Miller acting as producer and some memorable tunes being performed (most notably 'Hideaway' and 'Straight to the Heart'), this is one of altoist David Sanborn's better R&B-ish recordings. Joined by keyboardist Don Grolnick, guitarist Hiram Bullock, bassist Miller, drummer Buddy Williams and various guest musicians, Sanborn sounds fairly inspired and is in top form."

Track listing
"Hideaway" (Sanborn) – 6:37
"Straight to the Heart" (Marcus Miller) (live version) – 4:57	
"Run for Cover" (Marcus Miller) – 6:28
"Smile" (Coleridge Taylor Perkinson) – 10:25
"Lisa" (Sanborn) (live version) – 5:05
"Love & Happiness" (Al Green, Mabon "Teenie" Hodges) (live version) – 6:32
"Lotus Blossom" (Don Grolnick) (live version) – 6:50
"One Hundred Ways" (Tony Coleman, Kathy Wakefield, Benjamin Wright) – 4:07

Personnel 
 David Sanborn – alto saxophone
 Don Grolnick – keyboards
 Marcus Miller – synthesizers, bass guitar, backing vocals
 Hiram Bullock – guitars, backing vocals
 Buddy Williams – drums
 Errol "Crusher" Bennett – percussion (2)
 Ralph MacDonald – percussion (3, 5, 8)
 Michael White – percussion (6)
 Michael Brecker – tenor saxophone (8)
 Randy Brecker – trumpet (8)
 Jon Faddis – trumpet (8)
 Hamish Stuart – lead vocals (6)
 Vivian Cherry – backing vocals (8)
 Frank Floyd – backing vocals (8)
 Lani Groves – backing vocals (8)

Production 
 Russ Titelman – executive producer 
 Marcus Miller – producer 
 Elliot Scheiner – recording, mixing
 Paul Brown – additional engineer
 Guy Charbonneau – additional engineer
 Marti Robertson – additional engineer
 Jerry Solomon – additional engineer
 Joe Arnold – second engineer
 Cliff Bonnell – second engineer
 Erika Klein – second engineer
 Stanley Wallace – second engineer
 George Marino – mastering at Sterling Sound (New York, New York).
 Gary Gellar – live recording coordinator 
 Mary Melia – production assistant
 Shirley Klein – album coordinator
 Laura LiPuma – art direction, design
 Toshi Kazama – photography

References

David Sanborn albums
1984 live albums
Albums produced by Marcus Miller
Warner Records live albums
Grammy Award for Best Jazz Fusion Performance